Food and Bioprocess Technology is a peer-reviewed scientific journal published by Springer Science+Business Media. The editor-in-chief is Da-Wen Sun (University College Dublin).

Abstracting and indexing 
Food and Bioprocess Technology is abstracted and indexed in:

According to the Journal Citation Reports, the journal has a 2011 impact factor of 3.703, ranking it 4th out of 138 journals in the category "Food Science & Technology".

References

External links
 
 Print: 
 Online: 

Food science journals
Springer Science+Business Media academic journals
English-language journals
Publications established in 2008